The 2nd Myx Music Awards was held on March 15, 2007, at the AFP Theater.

List of nominees and winners

Winners are in bold text

Favorite Music Video
 "Martyr Nyebera" by Kamikazee
 "Bitiw" by Sponge Cola
 "Sugod" by Sandwich
 "Invincible" by Christian Bautista
 "Doo Bidoo" by Kamikazee

Favorite Song
 "Narda" by Kamikazee
 "Bitiw" by Sponge Cola
 "Sugod" by Sandwich
 "Doo Bidoo" by Kamikazee
 "Stars" by Callalily

Favorite Artist
 Kamikazee
 Sponge Cola
 Sandwich
 Hale
 Imago

Favorite Male Artist
 Christian Bautista
 Erik Santos
 Gary Valenciano
 Michael V.
 Sam Milby

Favorite Female Artist
 Sarah Geronimo
 Rachelle Ann Go
 Nina
 Sitti
 Toni Gonzaga

Favorite Group
 Kamikazee
 Sponge Cola
 Sandwich
 Hale
 6cyclemind

Favorite Collaboration
 "Bakit Ba Iniibig Ka" by Erik Santos and Regine Velasquez
 "The Ordertaker" by Parokya ni Edgar and Kamikazee
 "Hindi Ko Na Kayang Masaktan Pa" by Ogie Alcasid and Regine Velasquez
 "Superproxy 2k6" by Francis M. and Ely Buendia
 "Umaasa" by 6Cyclemind and Francis M.

Favorite Remake
 "Doo Bidoo" by Kamikazee
 "Nakapagtataka" by Sponge Cola
 "Your Love" by Erik Santos
 "Panalangin" by Moonstar88
 "Yakap Sa Dilim" by Orange & Lemons

Favorite Rock Video
 "Bitiw" by Sponge Cola
 "Sugod" by Sandwich
 "Doo Bidoo" by Kamikazee
 "Waltz" by Hale
 "The Ordertaker" by Parokya ni Edgar feat. Kamikazee

Favorite Mellow Video
 "I Still Believe in Loving You" by Sarah Geronimo
 "Dahil Ikaw" by True Faith
 "Invincible" by Christian Bautista "Someday" by Nina
 "You Give Me Reason" by Gary V.

Favorite Urban Video
 "I Do" by Nina "Solid" by Pikaso
 "Manila" by Amber
 "Igalaw Mo Lang" by Dcoy & RP
 "6 in the Morning" by Dice & K9 Mobbstarr

Favorite Indie Artist
 Kjwan Queso
 Up Dharma Down
 Dong Abay
 Mayonnaise

Favorite New Artist
 Callalily
 Kala Hilera
 Toni Gonzaga
 Yeng COnstantino

Favorite MYX Live Performance
 APO Hiking Society
 Christian Bautista Kjwan
 Slapshock
 Dong Abay

Favorite International Music Video
 "Buttons" by The Pussycat Dolls
 "Welcome To The Black Parade" by My Chemical Romance "Bebot" by The Black Eyed Peas
 "Breaking Free" by Nikki Gil, Vince Chong and Alicia Pan
 "SexyBack" by Justin Timberlake

Favorite Media Soundtrack
 "Dahil Ikaw" by True Faith for Sa Piling Mo "Isang Bandila" by Rivermaya for Bandila
 "Nakakabaliw" by Barbie Almalbis and Pupil for Juicy Fruit Rockoustic Mania
 "First Day High" by Kamikazee for Rexona, First Day High
 "Super Noypi" by Sandwich for Super Noypi

Favorite Guest Appearance in a Music Video
 Rica Peralejo for "Martyr Nyebera" by Kamikazee
 Piolo Pascual for "We Belong" by Toni Gonzaga
 Gretchen Barretto for "Minamahal Kita" by Ogie Alcasid
 Edu Manzano for "DVDX" by Sandwich
 Chin-Chin Gutierrez for "Pintura" by KjwanFavorite MYX Celebrity VJ
 Michael V.'''
 Gary V.
 Jojo A.
 Maverick & Ariel
 Kamikazee

Favorite Myx Bandarito Performance
The Ambassadors

Favorite Ringtone
"Narda" by Kamikazee

MYX Magna Award
Apo Hiking Society

References

Philippine music awards